The Chōsen Anthracite Company, Ltd. (Japanese: 朝鮮無煙炭株式会社 Chōsen Muentan Kabushiki Kaisha; Korean: 조선무연탄주식회사 Joseon Muyeontan Jusikhoesa) was a kabushiki kaisha in colonial Korea that operated collieries around Korea. It was founded in 1927 by the Mitsubishi zaibatsu of Japan by integrating the anthracite mining operations around Heijō, eventually becoming the largest coal-producing company in Korea - 74.9% of the coal distributed in Korea was produced by the Chōsen Anthracite Company.

In 1935, majority control of the Chōsen Anthracite Company went to the Oriental Development Company (Japanese: Tōyō Takushoku Kabushiki Kaisha), which transformed the Chosen Anthracite Company into a multipurpose company which, in addition to the production and distribution of coal, built and operated ports and railways.

On 17 December 1943 the Chōsen Anthracite Company opened a railway line from Bunsen on the Chōsen Government Railway's Kankyō Line to a port it had constructed at Kogan-dō, Bunsen city, Gangwon Province. Named the Bunsen Port Line, it ran  from Bunsen Station to Genzan North Port Station.

Following the partition of Korea and the establishment of North Korea, the company was abolished. The Muncheon Port Line, along with all other railway lines in the country, was nationalised on 10 August 1946, becoming part of the Korean State Railway.

References

Rail transport in North Korea
Rail transport in Korea
Defunct railway companies of Korea
Korea under Japanese rule
Defunct companies of Japan